Leporicypraea is a genus of sea snails, marine gastropod mollusks in the family Cypraeidae, the cowries.  

Species within this genus are commonly found in the Indo-Pacific region.

Species
Species of Leporicypraea include:
 Leporicypraea geographica (Schilder & Schilder, 1933)
Leporicypraea mappa (Linnaeus, 1758)
 Leporicypraea rosea (Gray, 1824)
Leporicypraea valentia (Perry, 1811)
Nomen dubium 
 Leporicypraea alga (Perry, 1811)

References

External links
 Iredale, T. (1930). Queensland molluscan notes, No. 2. Memoirs of the Queensland Museum. 10(1): 73-88, pl. 9

Cypraeidae